Ancylolomia japonica is a moth of the family Crambidae. It is found in Ussuri, Korea, Japan, China (Yunnan, Kansu, Shantung, Fukien, Kwangtung), Tibet and Taiwan.

The wingspan is 24–38 mm.

References

Moths described in 1877
Ancylolomia
Moths of Asia